Pineville (locally ) is a suburban town in the southernmost portion of Mecklenburg County, North Carolina, United States, situated in the Waxhaws district between Charlotte and Fort Mill.

History 
Pineville became known as a mule trading center during the time of the Charlotte 'gold rush'. At that time 'Pineville' was called 'Morrow's Turnout'.  Located at the intersection of two major Native American trading routes, it had vast meadows in which the animals of trade and transportation could be 'turned-out' to pasture.

Pineville was incorporated as a town in 1873. The origins of the name Pineville can be traced back to 1852, when the Charlotte & Columbia Railroad came through the Pineville area. The railroad wanted a more modern name, and the large stands of pine trees in the area inspired the new name – Pineville. In the 1890s, Dover Yarn Mills established a cotton mill in Pineville.  This mill later became Cone Mills, Inc., which operated in the town until November of 1991. The one-block area of old Pineville was a bustling commercial area, with many different shops. Today this area is home to many quaint shops and restaurants.

The growth of Pineville was greatly changed through the initial segment of I-485 opening to traffic. Although the one-mile (1.6 km) stretch connecting interchanges at NC Highway 51 and South Boulevard was designed to divert through traffic around Charlotte via a freeway loop, I-485 incidentally passed through Pineville's town limits. In the years to follow, largely undeveloped land adjacent to Pineville's two I-485 interchanges, developed into what is now the largest shopping district in North Carolina.

It is the birthplace of James K. Polk, the 11th U.S. president. His home is no longer standing, but an original cabin from that time period is kept there, symbolic of the one he was born in. This is now a state historic  site. It has two reconstructed log cabins, both from the local area being built circa 1790. They are furnished in period antiques similar to what the Polks would have used. There is a main house, a cookhouse, and a log barn, and tours are available by costumed guides. First Lady of U.S. at the time, Ladybird Johnson, came to Pineville to dedicate the new state site. In addition to the period log houses there is a museum with a short film on the life and times of James Knox Polk along with period clothes and other artifacts of the area and era. A monument was erected in 1904 on the site of the present-day reconstructed cabins. The state of North Carolina moved the monument from its original location in 1964. It was moved to its current location near the visitor center in 1968.

Geography 
Pineville is located at  (35.085737, -80.888167).

Demographics

2020 census

As of the 2020 United States census, there were 10,602 people, 3,732 households, and 1,934 families residing in the town.

2018
According to the State Demographer of the North Carolina Office of State Budget and Management, the Town's population as of July 1, 2018 is estimated to be 9,338.

2010 census
As of the 2010 census, the town's population is 7,479.

2000 census
As of the census of 2000, there were 3,449 people, 1,632 households, and 744 families residing in the town.  The population density was 965.8 people per square mile (373.0/km).  There were 1,760 housing units at an average density of 492.8 per square mile (190.3/km).  The racial makeup of the town was 80.05% White, 10.00% African American, 0.20% Native American, 3.31% Asian, 0.06% Pacific Islander, 4.00% from other races, and 2.38% from two or more races. Hispanic or Latino of any race were 11.16% of the population.

There were 1,632 households, out of which 19.9% had children under the age of 18 living with them, 31.1% were married couples living together, 10.0% had a female householder with no husband present, and 54.4% were non-families. 42.3% of all households were made up of individuals, and 7.4% had someone living alone who was 65 years of age or older.  The average household size was 2.04 and the average family size was 2.80.

The age range of Pineville's population is 17.5% under the age of 18, 13.0% from 18 to 24, 42.2% from 25 to 44, 16.1% from 45 to 64, and 11.2% 65 years of age or older.  The median age was 32 years. For every 100 females, there were 98.4 males.  For every 100 females age 18 and over, there were 97.6 males.

The median income for a household in the town was $38,261, and the median income for a family was $45,500. Males had a median income of $30,833 versus $29,508 for females. The per capita income for the town was $21,958.  About 3.6% of families and 6.6% of the population were below the poverty line, including 11.7% of those under age 18 and 7.2% of those age 65 or over.

Healthcare 
Pineville is served by Atrium Health Pineville, a 206-bed acute care facility opened in 1987, a member of Atrium Health.

Education 
Pineville is in Charlotte-Mecklenburg Schools.

Most areas are zoned to Pineville Elementary School. Some residential areas are zoned to Smithfield Elementary School. All residents are zoned to Quail Hollow Middle School, and South Mecklenburg High School.

Notable people
 Julianna Cannamela, artistic gymnast
 Lauren Cholewinski, Olympic speed skater
 Julius Daniels, American Piedmont blues musician
 Walter Davis, NBA player who was a 6x All-Star
 Lew Massey, professional basketball player
 James K. Polk, the 11th president of the United States, serving from 1845 to 1849
 Erwin Potts, first non-McClatchy family member CEO of the McClatchy Company
 Charles T. Robertson Jr., retired United States Air Force general

References

External links

 Official website of Pineville, NC
 President James K. Polk State Historic Site 

Towns in Mecklenburg County, North Carolina
Towns in North Carolina